Minimum is an unincorporated community in southeastern Iron County, in the U.S. state of Missouri.

The community lies on the banks of Crane Pond Creek, just north of that stream's confluence with Sulphur Creek. It is located at the intersection of Missouri Route C and County Road 134. The town of Annapolis, on Missouri Route 49, is approximately six miles to the west.

History
A post office called Minimum was established in 1904, and remained in operation until 1955. The name "Minimum" is said to be derived from the first name of Minnie Farr, the wife of an early postmaster.

References

Unincorporated communities in Iron County, Missouri
Unincorporated communities in Missouri